Jeff Rutter (born January 28, 1965) is an American basketball coach. He currently serves as an assistant men's basketball coach at Western Michigan. Rutter also served as the interim head coach at Drake from December 2016 to March 2017.

Coaching history
Rutter has served as an assistant coach at the Division II and Division I levels. He moved with Greg McDermott from Northern Iowa to Iowa State in 2006 and stayed on as director of basketball operations at Iowa State after McDermott was replaced by Fred Hoiberg.

Following the December 2016 resignation of Ray Giacoletti, Rutter took his first Division I head coaching job as the interim head coach of Drake.  Since Drake he has served as an assistant and Miami (OH) and Western Michigan

Head coaching record

*Took over as head coach for the rest of the season when Ray Giacoletti resigned on December 6, 2016. Drake's record for the 2016–17 season was 7–24 overall and 5–13 in the MVC.

References

External links
 Drake University profile

1965 births
Living people
American men's basketball players
Basketball coaches from Wisconsin
Basketball players from Wisconsin
College men's basketball head coaches in the United States
Drake Bulldogs men's basketball coaches
Iowa State Cyclones men's basketball coaches
North Dakota State Bison men's basketball coaches
Northern Iowa Panthers men's basketball coaches
People from West Allis, Wisconsin
Sportspeople from the Milwaukee metropolitan area
Stetson Hatters men's basketball coaches
Winona State Warriors men's basketball players
Wisconsin–Parkside Rangers men's basketball coaches